Xanthate usually refers to a salt of xanthic acid. Xanthate also refers to the anion . Xanthate also may refer to an ester of xanthic acid. The salts of xanthates are also called O-organyl dithioates. The esters of xanthic acid are also called O,S-diorganyl esters of dithiocarbonic acid. The name xanthate is derived from Ancient Greek  xanthos, meaning “yellowish, golden”, and indeed most xanthate salts are yellow. They were discovered and named in 1823 by Danish chemist William Christopher Zeise. These organosulfur compounds are important in two areas: the production of cellophane and related polymers from cellulose and (in mining) for extraction of certain sulphide bearing ores. They are also versatile intermediates in organic synthesis.

Formation and structure
Xanthate salts of alkali metals are produced by the treatment of an alcohol, alkali, and carbon disulfide. The process is called xanthation. In chemical terminology, the alkali reacts with the alcohol to produce an alkoxide, which is the nucleophile that adds to the electrophilic carbon atom in CS2. Often the alkoxide is generated in situ by treating the alcohol with sodium hydroxide or potassium hydroxide:
ROH  +  CS2  +  KOH  →  ROCS2K  +  H2O
For example, sodium ethoxide gives sodium ethyl xanthate.  Many alcohols can be used in this reaction. Technical grade xanthate salts are usually of 90–95% purity.  Impurities include alkali metal sulfides, sulfates, trithiocarbonates, thiosulfates, sulfites, or carbonates as well as residual raw material such as alcohol and alkali hydroxide. These salts are available commercially as powder, granules, flakes, sticks, and solutions are available. 

Some commercially or otherwise useful xanthate salts include:
 sodium ethyl xanthate  CH3CH2OCS2Na
 potassium ethyl xanthate, CH3CH2OCS2K
 potassium isopropyl xanthate, (CH3)2CHOCS2K
 sodium isobutyl xanthate, (CH3)2CHCH2OCS2Na
 potassium amyl xanthate, CH3(CH2)4OCS2K

The OCS2 core of xanthate salts, like that of the carbonates and the esters has trigonal planar molecular geometry.  The central carbon atom is sp2-hybridized.

Reactions

Acid-base properties
Xanthatic acids, with the formula ROC(S)SH, can be prepared by treating alkali metal xanthates, e.g. potassium ethyl xanthate, with hydrochloric acid at low temperatures.  The methyl and ethyl xanthic acids are oils that are soluble in organic solvents.  Benzyl xanthic acid is a solid.  They have pKas near 2.ref></ref>  These compounds thermally decompose in the presence of base to the alcohol and carbon disulfide.

Xanthic acids characteristically decompose:
ROCS2K + HCl → ROH  +  CS2  +  KCl
This reaction is the reverse of the method for the preparation of the xanthate salts.  The intermediate in the decomposition is the xanthic acid, ROC(S)SH, which can be isolated in certain cases.

Other reactions
Xanthate anions also undergo alkylation to give xanthate esters, which are generally stable:
ROCS2K + R′X → ROC(S)SR′ + KX
The C-O bond in these compounds are susceptible to cleavage by the Barton–McCombie deoxygenation, which provides a means for deoxygenation of alcohols.

They can be oxidized to dixanthogen disulfides:
2 ROCS2Na + I2 → ROC(S)S2C(S)OR + 2 NaI

Acylation of xanthates gives alkyl xanthogen esters (ROC(S)SC(O)R') and related anhydrides.

Xanthates bind to transition metal cations as bidentate ligands. The charge-neutral complexes are soluble in organic solvents.

Xanthates are intermediates in the Chugaev elimination process.  They can be used to control radical polymerisation under the RAFT process, also termed MADIX (macromolecular design via interchange of xanthates).

Industrial applications

Cellulose reacts with carbon disulfide (CS2) in presence of sodium hydroxide (NaOH) to produces sodium cellulose xanthate, which upon neutralization with sulfuric acid (H2SO4) gives viscose rayon or cellophane paper (Sellotape or Scotch Tape).

Xanthate salts (e.g. sodium alkyl xanthates, Dixanthogen) are widely used as flotation agents in mineral processing.

Related compounds
Rarely encountered, thioxanthates arise by the reaction of CS2 with thiolate salts.  For example, sodium ethylthioxanthate has the formula C2H5SCS2Na.  Dithiocarbamates are also related compounds. They arise from the reaction of a secondary amine with CS2. For example, sodium diethyldithiocarbamate has the formula (C2H5)2NCS2Na.

Environmental impacts
While biodegradable, this class of chemicals may be toxic to life in water at concentrations of less than 1 mg/L. Water downstream of mining operations is often contaminated with xanthates.

References

Salts
Functional groups
Thiocarbonyl compounds